The Houston Texas Temple is the 97th operating temple of the Church of Jesus Christ of Latter-day Saints (LDS Church). The temple serves over forty-four thousand Latter-day Saints in east Texas, and a few congregations in southwest Louisiana.

History
After the September 1997 announcement that the LDS Church would build a temple in Houston, the search began for an appropriate site. The site chosen formerly belonged to a developer unwilling to sell.  Years earlier, however, the developer had gone through difficult financial times and had made a promise to God that if God would help him avoid financial ruin, he would someday "pay God back".  When the developer learned what was proposed to be built on his land, he decided to sell the land as his way of paying God back.

LDS Church president Gordon B. Hinckley dedicated the Houston Texas Temple on August 26, 2000.

In 2017, Hurricane Harvey caused significant flood damage.  As a result, although the temple had not been in use since August, the church formally announced its closure for renovations in October 2017.  Following completion of the renovations, the temple was rededicated by M. Russell Ballard on April 22, 2018.

In 2020, like all the church's other temples, the Houston Texas Temple was closed in response to the coronavirus pandemic.

See also

 William R. Bradford, former temple president
 Comparison of temples of The Church of Jesus Christ of Latter-day Saints
 List of temples of The Church of Jesus Christ of Latter-day Saints
 List of temples of The Church of Jesus Christ of Latter-day Saints by geographic region
 Temple architecture (Latter-day Saints)
 The Church of Jesus Christ of Latter-day Saints in Texas

Additional reading

References

External links
 
 Official Houston Texas Temple page
 Houston Texas Temple at ChurchofJesusChristTemples.org

20th-century Latter Day Saint temples
Buildings and structures in Harris County, Texas
Temples (LDS Church) completed in 2000
Temples (LDS Church) in Texas
2000 establishments in Texas